Dobe may refer to:

Dobê, a village in the Tibet Autonomous Region of China
Dobe, Slovenia, a settlement in the Municipality of Kostanjevica na Krki in Slovenia